Coley Logan (September 20, 1912 – November 8, 1999) was an American Negro league baseball player in the 1940s.

A native of Columbia, South Carolina, Logan played for the Philadelphia Stars in 1940. He died in Hudson, New York in 1999 at age 87.

References

External links
 and Seamheads

1912 births
1999 deaths
Philadelphia Stars players
Baseball players from Columbia, South Carolina
20th-century African-American sportspeople